Security ratings are an objective, data-driven, quantifiable measurement of an organization’s overall cybersecurity performance. Security ratings provide businesses and government agencies with a third-party, independent view into the security behaviors and practices of their own organization as well as that of their business partners. Security ratings are a useful tool in evaluating cyber risk and facilitating collaborative, risk-based conversations.

According to Gartner, cybersecurity ratings will become as important as credit ratings when assessing the risk of existing and new business relationships. Gartner predicts that these services will be a perquisite for business relationships

Security Rating Services 
The adoption of security rating services platforms is on the rise. In fact, Forrester Consulting found that 87% of respondents find security ratings valuable (37%) or extremely valuable (50%). There are a number of companies that provide security ratings services, including ISS, SecurityScorecard, myCYPR, Panorays, BitSight, FortifyData, RiskRecon, Black Kite and UpGuard.

Security Rating Services in 2020 
The COVID-19 pandemic has created a completely different environment for cyber-risk. According to S&P Global Ratings, rating services may become an exception to these changes in the world of cyber-risk. Given the COVID-19 pandemic that occurred in 2020, many brick and mortar shops that have mainly been exclusively accessible through in-person contact, have been forced to provide their goods and services through a website. This shift causes a larger need for these services given the increase in possible clients that want to know the safety of their business domain.

References 

Risk management
Security